Dragon Dreams is a studio album released in 2008 by Canadian singer-songwriter Jane Siberry under the name Issa.  According to the album artwork, it is "the first of a story told in three parts."  The music was written, produced, and arranged by Jane Siberry;  all references to the artist in this recording are under the name Issa.

Track listing
"A Train is Coming [excerpt]"
"Wilderness Wheel"
"Superhero Dream"
"Grace"
"Oui Allo?"
"I Pick Up the Phone"
"You Never Know"
"You Had a Good Thing"
"When We Are Queen"
"A Train is Coming"
"Send Me Someone to Love"

Personnel
Singers:  Catherine Russell, Marlon Saunders, Leslie Alexander, Gyan, Jacob Switzer, Paige Stewart-Escoffery, Ruby Salvatore Palmer, Gail Ann Dorsey, Maggie Moore, Rebecca Shoichet, Kerry Latimer, Rae Armour, John MacArthur Ellis

Instruments:
John MacArthur Ellis - pedal steel, guitars
Pauline Kim -  violin, viola
Christine Kim:  cello
James Roe -  oboe
Rich Brown -  bass
Niko Friesen -  drums
Carlos Beceiro -  zanfona (hurdy-gurdy)
Jamie Muñoz -  bagpipes

References

Jane Siberry albums
2008 albums